Severe Tropical Cyclone Ernie was one of the quickest strengthening tropical cyclones on
record. Ernie was the first Category 5 severe tropical cyclone in the Australian region since Cyclone Marcia in 2015, and also the strongest tropical cyclone in the Australian region since Cyclone Ita in 2014. Ernie developed from a tropical low into a cyclone south of Indonesia in the northeast Indian Ocean on 6 April 2017, and proceeded to intensify extremely rapidly to a Category 5 severe tropical cyclone. A few days later, on 10 April, the system was downgraded below cyclone intensity following a period of rapid weakening (though not nearly as rapid as its intensification), located southwest of its original position. Ernie had no known impacts on any land areas.

Meteorological history

The system had been tracking in a generally westwards direction during the previous few days as a weak area of low pressure, but had not been significant enough to warrant the issuance of tropical cyclone warnings. The tropical low tracked south-westwards throughout the day of 5 April, before adopting a course to the south-southwest during the night. On the morning of 6 April, sustained gale-force winds developed on the western side of the system. Despite the existence of these cyclone-strength winds, the Bureau of Meteorology still classified the storm as a tropical low because they did not extend more than halfway around the system.

The storm continued its trend of steady intensification, and was upgraded to a Category 1 cyclone on the Australian tropical cyclone intensity scale by 12:00 UTC on 6 April. The storm was assigned the name Ernie – the seventh tropical cyclone and sixth named storm of the 2016-17 Australian region cyclone season. This intensification to Category 1 status marked the beginning of a period of explosive intensification lasting about 24–30 hours, which concluded with Ernie being upgraded to a Category 5 severe tropical cyclone at about 12:00 UTC on 7 April.

Soon afterwards, the system turned to the west-southwest and encountered an unfavorable environment of increased wind shear, dryer air, and cooler sea surface temperatures, which caused Ernie to weaken. The storm was downgraded to Category 3 status by 12:00 UTC on 8 April, about one day after it reached Category 5 intensity. Ernie's decline in strength was paused, though, when the system began to re-intensify a few hours later, on the morning of 9 April, local time. The renewed period of strengthening proved short-lived and meager, however, as Ernie began weakening again on the afternoon of the same day, before it could reattain Category 4 status. The cyclone was downgraded below severe tropical cyclone status to Category 2 intensity by 12:00 UTC on 9 April, and then further to Category 1 intensity by 00:00 UTC on the following day. Ernie weakened below tropical cyclone intensity by 06:00 UTC on 10 April, ending its short but significant 90-hour existence as a cyclone. Gales persisted in the southern quadrants of the system for a number of hours despite its declassification, due to the steep pressure gradient caused by a high pressure ridge to the south. Ex-Tropical Cyclone Ernie continued to track to the west-southwest, and later in a more southerly direction until the remnants of the system dissipated four days later.

Rapid intensification
Severe Tropical Cyclone Ernie was a particularly noteworthy cyclone due to its extremely rapid rate of intensification. On the morning of 6 April, when gale-force winds were present on the western side of the developing tropical low, the storm was predicted to remain relatively weak, and reach only a marginal Category 2 intensity by the early hours of 8 April local time. After that time, it was forecast to weaken gradually while tracking to the west-southwest.

Soon, in defiance of even this raised intensity forecast, environmental conditions became near perfect for Ernie to intensify extremely rapidly, and to a high degree. The storm intensified to a Category 4 severe tropical cyclone by 06:00 UTC on 7 April, then reached Category 5 status at about 12:00 UTC. From this point on, the cyclone continued to strengthen further, however at a much less frenetic pace. Overall, Severe Tropical Cyclone Ernie intensified from a tropical low to a Category 5 severe tropical cyclone in just 24–30 hours. The Bureau of Meteorology labelled this period of explosive intensification as ‘extraordinary’ in the cyclone's severe weather report.

Impacts
Throughout its existence, Ernie tracked generally southwards as it intensified, and then generally to the west-southwest as it weakened. This track led the system to be located a considerable distance away from all land areas, including well to the northwest of Western Australia, well to the east of Christmas Island and the Cocos (Keeling) Islands, and well to the south of Indonesia. Consequently, Ernie did not cause any known impacts on land in terms of property damage, heavy rain or strong winds and was not retired from the list of names used by the BOM.

See also

Weather of 2016 and 2017
Tropical cyclones in 2016 and 2017
Cyclone Gillian – intensified rapidly from Category 3 to Category 5 on the Australian scale in 24 hours in March 2014, in a similar area to Ernie
Cyclone Hellen – intensified explosively in the Mozambique Channel in March 2014 at a rate Metéo-France referred to as 'astounding'
Cyclone Ita – intensified explosively while approaching the Far North Queensland coast from Papua New Guinea in 2014
Hurricane Patricia – the second strongest tropical cyclone worldwide with a pressure of 872 hPa (mbar; 25.75 inHg), intensified explosively in the eastern Pacific Ocean from a tropical storm to a Category 5 major hurricane on the Saffir–Simpson scale in 24 hours during October 2015
Hurricane Wilma – the strongest Atlantic hurricane on record, intensified explosively in the Caribbean Sea from a Category 1 hurricane to a Category 5 major hurricane on the Saffir–Simpson scale in 24 hours during October 2005

References

External links

Ernie
Ernie
April 2017 events
Ernie